Elswick is a rural village and civil parish on the Fylde coast of Lancashire, England. At the 2011 Census, it had a population of 1,079.

At the Norman conquest of England in 1066, Elswick was a small agricultural community in the hundred of Amounderness. The village was originally part of the ecclesiastical parish of St Michael's on Wyre. A Nonconformist chapel was built in Elswick before 1650.

Elswick is part of the local government district of Fylde and the parliamentary constituency of Fylde.

History
Elswick was listed in the Domesday Book of 1086 as Edeleswic. In later documents it was recorded variously as Etleswhic, Etheliswyck and Elleswyk. At the time of the Norman conquest of England in 1066, the township of Elswick—as part of the ancient hundred of Amounderness—was in the possession of Earl Tostig, the brother of King Harold II. Tostig died at the Battle of Stamford Bridge and his lands were subsequently taken over by the Normans. Between 1069 and 1086 William the Conqueror gave Amounderness to Anglo-Norman baron Roger the Poitevin. In the Domesday Book, the area of Elswick was estimated at three carucates of land.

In the 13th century, part of the township of Elswick was owned by the lord of Freckleton, and smaller parts by Warine de Whittingham and Alan de Singleton. In the early 16th century, Henry VII's administrator Edmund Dudley held the township and it was later in the possession of Thomas Stanley, 2nd Earl of Derby.

By 1650 a chapel had been built in the village which at that point was recorded as containing 50 families. It was intended to be a chapel of ease to St Michael's but was neither endowed nor consecrated, possibly because of the turmoil of the English Civil War. The chapel was licensed in 1671 for use as a Nonconformists' meeting place and used initially by Presbyterian worshippers. When this licence was made illegal, the chapel closed and later reopened as a Congregational chapel. In 1753, it was replaced by a new building, which was enlarged in 1838. This in turn was replaced by a chapel built 1873–74 by H. J. Powell, on land given by a Miss Harrison.

In 1902, a sanatorium for smallpox sufferers was built in the village. It was later a treatment centre for tuberculosis patients and then a probation hostel. It is now a private residence.

Between 1951 and 1956 just off the Roseacre Road between Elswick and Roseacre was the site of a VHF fixer station,  part of the RAF Western Sector, and was one of a number similar fixed sites managed by nearby  RAF Longley Lane. The site contained an octagonal wooden hut with a hand steerable radio mast with two radio receivers of type R1392D,[5] transmitter and telephone line. This hut was protected by a close surrounding octagonal brick wall to provide some bomb blast protection. The station was used to allow each sector to locate RAF or allied aircraft and to help pilots find airfield runways in low cloud weather conditions. The site had three RAF wireless personnel (two were normally on duty) who were billeted in Elswick village. The site closed in around 1956 as the technology was replaced by improved systems.

Governance

Elswick is governed locally by a parish council, which is made up of seven elected councillors. Elswick, with the parish of Little Eccleston-with-Larbreck, forms the ward of Elswick and Little Eccleston, which elects one councillor. The population of this ward at the 2011 Census was 1,479.  In 2011 the ward was represented by Paul Hayhurst, a non-aligned councillor.

The village is represented in the House of Commons of the Parliament of the United Kingdom as part of the  constituency of Fylde. It elects one Member of Parliament (MP) by the first past the post system of election. Since the 2010 general election, Fylde has been represented at Parliament by Conservative MP Mark Menzies. The village was part of the North West England constituency of the European Parliament.

Geography

Nearby villages include Great Eccleston, St Michael's on Wyre and Thistleton.

Elswick has a generally temperate maritime climate like much of the British Isles, with cool summers and mild winters.

Demography
At the 2001 UK census, the civil parish of Elswick had a population of 1,057. The 2001 population density for the ward of Elswick and Little Eccleston was 1.61 per hectare, with a 100 to 96.8 female-to-male ratio. The proportion of residents who classified themselves as White was 99.5%, a figure higher than those for Fylde (98.6%), the North West (94.4%) and England (90.9%).

Elswick and Little Eccleston's 573 households included 21.5% one-person, 52.7% married couples living together (with or without children), 6.5% co-habiting couples, and 4.9% single parents with their children.

Population change

Economy

Historically, Elswick has largely been a rural agricultural community. In the 11th century it had the largest amount of cultivated land in the parish of St Michael. There was also a cottage weaving industry in the village up to the 19th century with villagers weaving flax and then cotton on hand looms. In the 21st century, Elswick is a dormitory village and many residents commute to Preston, Blackpool and Poulton-le-Fylde.

In 2001, compared to the rest of the Fylde borough, Elswick had a low proportion of unemployed people, and a low proportion of people in NRS social grade "E" (those at the lowest levels of subsistence). The percentage of unemployed people in the Elswick and Little Eccleston ward was lower than the averages for North West England and England as a whole, although slightly higher than the average for Fylde. There is a higher percentage of self-employed workers in Elswick and Little Eccleston than in Fylde, North West England and England as a whole.

Landmarks

The Congregational chapel of 1753 is now used as a church hall. It is a roughcast building on a rectangular plan with a two-storey house attached. The old chapel has been designated a Grade II listed building by English Heritage. The newer chapel, completed in 1874, is in the style of a traditional parish church with a tower. It is now a United Reformed church.

Elswick Manor is an early 19th-century house. It is rendered and has slate roofs. It has also received a Grade II designation. Hartwell and Pevsner (2009) describe the building as "nothing special". Other listed buildings in Elswick include the lodge to the manor house and farm buildings.

The village has two pubs—the Ship Inn and the Boot and Shoe. The village is known locally for its ice cream parlour, Bonds of Elswick.

Transport
The railway came to the Fylde in 1840. There is no route through Elswick; the nearest railway stations to the village are Poulton-le-Fylde and Kirkham and Wesham, both on the line between Blackpool and Preston.

This 
airport has been closed for commercial use. The North West region is also served by the larger Liverpool John Lennon Airport and Manchester Airport.

See also

Listed buildings in Elswick, Lancashire
List of civil parishes in Lancashire

References
Footnotes

Bibliography

External links

Civil parishes in Lancashire
Geography of the Borough of Fylde
Villages in Lancashire